V. spicata may refer to:
 Veronica spicata, the spiked speedwell, a plant species
 Verticordia spicata, a flowering plant species

See also
 Spicata (disambiguation)